Alejandro Pérez may refer to:

 Alejandro Pérez (boxer) (born 2000), Mexican American boxer and singer
 Alejandro Pérez (fighter) (born 1989), Mexican mixed martial artist
 Álex Pérez (footballer, born 1991) (Alejandro Pérez Navarro), Spanish footballer
 Álex Pérez (footballer, born 1985) (Alejandro Pérez Aracil), Spanish footballer
 Alejandro Perez, a character played by Tony Plana in Desperate Housewives